Quiet Design is an independent music and sound art label based in Austin,TX and founded in 2007. Owned and curated by composers Mike Vernusky and Cory Allen, Quiet Design has released work by over 30 artists from 10 countries. It has been said of Quiet Design that their "intriguing and often brilliant recordings will open your eyes, your ears, and very likely your mind."

The label's focus is releasing electronic music and sound art that is described as minimal, avant-garde and experimental. The packaging for each release is custom tailored to the sound of each piece in the catalog.

Artists on Quiet Design
Tetuzi Akiyama, Cory Allen, Jim Altieri, Christopher Ariza, Alfredo Barros, Daniel Blinkhorn, Mark Cetilia, Thomas Dempster, exclusiveOr, Fires Were Shot, Guy Gelem, Glen Hall, Glen Charles Halls, Erdem Helvacioglu, Nick Hennies, Jandek, Kioku, Clara Latham, Alvin Lucier, Yoshio Machida, Paula Matthusen, Alex Mincek, Kim Myhr, Alex Ness, Damian O'Riain, Duane Pitre, Sam Pluta, Sebastien Roux, Keith Rowe, Josh Russell, Paul Russell, Jeff Snyder, Kate Soper, Steinbruchel, Peter Swendsen, and Mike Vernusky

Catalog
Cory Allen, The Great Order, 2013
Steinbruchel + Cory Allen, Seam, 2012
Cory Allen, Still, 2011
Guy Gelem, Tides, 2011
Fires Were Shot, Awakened by a Lonely Feud, 2011
Cory Allen, Pearls, 2010
Mike Vernusky, Music for Film and Electro-Theatre, 2010
Alvin Lucier / Nick Hennies, Still and Moving Lines of Silence in Families of Hyperbolas, 2010
Mark Cetilia, Anemoi, 2009
Cory Allen, Hearing is Forgetting the Name of the Thing One Hears, 2009
Glen Hall / Glen Charles Halls, Northern Dialogues, 2009
Duane Pitre, ED09, 2009
Various, Spectra: Guitar in the 21st Century, 2009
Various, The Language Of, 2008
Cory Allen, The Fourth Way, 2008
Kioku, Live 6.14.08, 2008
exclusiveOr, S/T, 2008
Josh Russell, Sink, 2008
Kioku, Both Far and Near, 2008
Various, Resonance: Steel Pan in the 21st Century, 2007
Mike Vernusky, Blood that Sees the Light, 2007

Notes

External links
 Official site
 Discogs page

Experimental music record labels
Electronic music record labels